Tabacchi is an Italian surname. Notable people with the surname include:

Aaron Tabacchi (born 1998), Italian footballer
Doménica Tabacchi (born 1973), Ecuadorian journalist and politician
Frank Tabacchi (1910–1983), American baseball umpire
Giovanni Tabacchi (born 1931), Italian bobsledder
Odoardo Tabacchi (1836–1905), Italian sculptor

Italian-language surnames